Blue Origin NS-18 was a sub-orbital spaceflight mission operated by Blue Origin that launched on 13 October 2021. The mission was the eighteenth flight of the company's New Shepard integrated launch vehicle and spacecraft. It was the second crewed New Shepard launch. The flight, carrying four people including actor William Shatner, launched from Blue Origin's sub-orbital launch site in West Texas aboard the fourth flight of New Shepard booster NS4 and the spacecraft RSS First Step, both having previously flown on NS-14, NS-15, and NS-16 earlier in the year. 

At 90, Shatner became the oldest person to fly into space, surpassing the record of 82 which had been held by Wally Funk for three months since her flight on Blue Origin NS-16. Per Blue Origin, Shatner was a guest of the company on the flight and did not have to pay for the trip.

While in space, Shatner experienced the overview effect and articulated it live on camera in a post-flight conversation with Jeff Bezos.

Crew 
The crew of four include Blue Origin's vice president of mission and flight operations Audrey Powers, former NASA engineer and third Australian-born person in space Chris Boshuizen, vice chair for life sciences and healthcare at the French software company Dassault Systèmes Glen de Vries, and Canadian-American actor William Shatner.

References

External links 
 
 

Space tourism
2021 in spaceflight
Test spaceflights
Aviation history of the United States
Suborbital human spaceflights
2021 in Texas
2021 in aviation
William Shatner
New Shepard missions